Parliamentary elections were held in Yugoslavia on 5 May 1935. The result was a victory for the governing Yugoslav National Party (JNS), which won 303 of the 370 seats in Parliament.

Rioting among Croats and Slovenes prior to the election resulted in the death of 16 people during 19 and 20 February. Prior to the elections the government obstructed the Socialist Party of Yugoslavia from fielding candidates. On 1 May Yugoslav gendarmery killed one and injured 50 after rioting broke out in Sarajevo subsequent to authorities banning a speech by Mehmed Spaho.

On election day 2,000 anti-government protesters in Belgrade were dispersed by police. Hundreds of youth were arrested on election day and foreign journalists were expelled from the country.

Results

Elected members

Luka Abramović   (United Opposition, Glamoč, Vrbas Banovina)
Jordan Aćimović   (JNS, Strumica, Vardar Banovina)
Velimir Aćimović   (Grocka, Danube Banovina)
Kosta Aleksić   (Valjevo, Drina Banovina)
Borivoje Antić   (JNS, Salaš, Morava Banovina)
Dušan Antonijević   (JNS, Kruševo, Vardar Banovina)
Živojin Aranđelović   (Veliko Orašje, Danube Banovina)
Jovan Aranđelović   (JNS, Bela Palanka, Morava Banovina)
Miljkan Arežina   (JNS, Bosansko Grahovo, Vrbas Banovina)
Damjan Arnautović   (JNS, Berovo, Vardar Banovina)
Ljudevit Auer   (JNS, Sisak, Sava Banovina)
Antun Babić   (United Opposition, Županja, Sava Banovina)
Milan Badžak   (Mladenovac, Danube Banovina)
Milan Banić   (JNS, Sušak, Sava Banovina)
Ivan Banković   (United Opposition, Karlovac, Sava Banovina)
Janko Baričević  (JNS, Prelog, Sava Banovina)
Vinko Belinić   (JNS, Donja Stubica, Sava Banovina)
Josip Benko   (JNS, Murska Sobota, Drava Banovina)
Josip Berković  (Metković and Hvar, Littoral Banovina)
Šerif Bećirović   (JNS, Vučitrn, Morava Banovina)
Dimitrije Beširović   (JNS, Đevđelija, Vardar Banovina)
Mijo Birtić   (United Opposition, Đakovo, Sava Banovina)
Milan Blažić   (JNS, Ohrid, Vardar Banovina)
Petar Bogavac   (JNS, Kraljevo, Morava Banovina)
Strahinja Borisavljević  (JNS, Sjenica, Zeta Banovina)
Franjo Borić   (United Opposition, Crikvenica, Sava Banovina)
Dušan Bošković   (Kovačica and Pančevo, Danube Banovina)
Mihajlo Bošković   (JNS, Danilovgrad, Zeta Banovina)
Jakša Božić   (Rača, Danube Banovina)
Milan Božić   (Višegrad, Drina Banovina)
Ljubomir Božinović   (JNS, Knjaževac, Morava Banovina)
Đorđe Branković   (JNS, Otočac, Sava Banovina)
Mihael Brenčič   (JNS, Ptuj, Drava Banovina)
Jovan Brujić   (JNS, Doboj, Vrbas Banovina)
Stevan Bubić   (JNS, Bjelovar, Sava Banovina)
Šimun Bugarin   (United Opposition, Dugo Selo, Sava Banovina)
Simo Budimir   (JNS, Mrkonjić Grad, Vrbas Banovina)
Aleksandar Butorka   (Alibunar, Danube Banovina)
Ante Cividini   (United Opposition, Čabar, Sava Banovina)
Lazar Crljić   (JNS, Derventa, Vrbas Banovina)
Josip Cvetić   (JNS, Gospić, Sava Banovina)
Dragiša Cvetković   (JNS, Niš, Morava Banovina)
Nikola Cvetojević   (United Opposition, Bosanski Novi, Vrbas Banovina)
Sigismund Čajkovac   (United Opposition, Vinkovci, Sava Banovina)
Ragib Čapljić   (Rogatica, Drina Banovina)
Đuro Čejović   (JNS, Bar, Zeta Banovina)
Krsto Čolaković  (JNS, Srbica, Zeta Banovina)
Branko Čubrilović  (United Opposition, Bosanska Dubica, Vrbas Banovina)
Vojko Čvrkić
Stevan Ćirić
Husein Ćumavić   (Zvornik, Drina Banovina)
Aleksandar Dačić
Dragan Damić   (JNS, Slavonski Brod, Sava Banovina)
Živko Danilović   (JNS, Prijedor, Vrbas Banovina)
Brana Davinić
Radoslav Dimić   (JNS, Debar, Vardar Banovina)
Kosta Dimitrijević   (JNS, Varvarin, Morava Banovina)
Ljutica Dimitrijević   (JNS, Kladovo, Morava Banovina)
Mita Dimitrijević   (JNS, Kočani, Vardar Banovina)
Stojadin Dimitrijević   (JNS, Tetovo, Vardar Banovina)
Živojin Dimitrijević
Tanasije Dinić   (JNS, Sveti Nikola, Vardar Banovina)
Karel Doberšek   (JNS, Prevalje, Drava Banovina)
Rudolf Dobovišek   (United Opposition, Šmarje pri Jelšah, Drava Banovina)
Branko Dobrosavljević   (JNS, Slunj, Sava Banovina)
Milan Dobrović   (JNS, Daruvar, Sava Banovina)
Mato Domović   (United Opposition, Pregrada, Sava Banovina)
Mirko Došen   (JNS, Korenica, Sava Banovina)
Vojislav Došen
Mustafa Durgutović   (JNS, Orahovac, Zeta Banovina)
Vojislav Đorđević
Borivoje Đurić
Simo Ðurić   (JNS, Nova Gradiška, Sava Banovina)
Danilo Đurović   (JNS, Južni Brod, Vardar Banovina)
Milailo Đurović   (JNS, Surdulica, Vardar Banovina)
Bogdan Ercegovac   (JNS, Glina, Sava Banovina)
Viktor Fizir   (JNS, Ludbreg, Sava Banovina)
Riko Fuks   (JNS, Ljubljana, Drava Banovina)
Vojislav Gaćinović   (JNS, Bileća, Zeta Banovina)
Pavle Gajić
Radomir Gajić   (JNS, Donji Milanovac, Morava Banovina)
Karl Gajšek   (JNS, Slovenske Konjice, Drava Banovina)
Petar Galogaža   (JNS, Vrginmost, Sava Banovina)
Nikola Gavrilović   (JNS, Osijek, Sava Banovina)
Oto Gavrilović
Joca Georgijević
Andrija Gibanjek   (United Opposition, Čazma, Sava Banovina)
Milan Glavinić   (JNS, Priština, Vardar Banovina)
Milenko Glišić
Milan Golubović   (JNS, Svrljig, Morava Banovina)
Vinko Gornjak   (JNS, Maribor, Drava Banovina)
Milovan Grba   (JNS, Vojnić, Sava Banovina)
Risto Grćić   (JNS, Gacko, Zeta Banovina)
Jakob Grgurić
Spira Hadži-Ristić
Sulejman Hafizadić   (Travnik, Drina Banovina)
Franjo Harapin   (United Opposition, Klanjec, Sava Banovina)
Avdo Hasanbegović   (Tuzla, Drina Banovina)
Grga Hećimović   (United Opposition, Novi Vinodolski, Sava Banovina)
Stjepan Hefer   (HSS/United Opposition, Valpovo, Sava Banovina)
Stanko Hočevar   (JNS, Ljubljana, Drava Banovina)
Franjo Horvat   (JNS, Zagreb, Sava Banovina)
Nikola Hundrić   (United Opposition, Sveti Ivan Zelina, Sava Banovina)
Abdulah Ibrahimpašić   (United Opposition, Bihać, Vrbas Banovina)
Veljko Ilić   (JNS, Koprivnica, Sava Banovina)
Milivoje Isaković
Dušan Ivančević   (JNS, Gračac, Sava Banovina)
Petar Ivanišević   (JNS, Trebinje, Zeta Banovina)
Dragoljub Ivanović
Bogdan Iveković   (JNS, Novi Marof, Sava Banovina)
Ivan Jančič   (JNS, Maribor, Drava Banovina)
Vojislav Janjić
Desimir Janković   (JNS, Kučevo, Morava Banovina)
Dragutin Janković   (JNS, Skoplje, Vardar Banovina)
Stevan Janković
Ivan Janžekovič   (JNS, Maribor, Drava Banovina)
Cvetko Jeličić   (JNS, Brus, Morava Banovina)
Dragoljub Jevremović   (JNS, Petrovac na Mlavi, Morava Banovina)
Bogoljub Jevtić
Đorđe Jevtić
Životije Jevtić   (JNS, Jagodina, Morava Banovina)
Velimir Jojić   (JNS, Peć, Zeta Banovina)
Ugrin Joksimović   (JNS, Gostivar, Vardar Banovina)
Zarija Joksimović   (JNS, Berane, Zeta Banovina)
Dragoljub Jovanović   (United Opposition, Pirot, Morava Banovina)
Đorđe Jovanović
Jovan Jovanović   (JNS, Prnjavor, Vrbas Banovina)
Ljubomir Jovanović   (JNS, Aleksinac, Morava Banovina)
Nikola Jovanović   (JNS, Kolašin, Zeta Banovina)
Vasilije Jovanović   (JNS, Bosanski Petrovac, Vrbas Banovina)
Radoje Jovičić
Ivan Juriša   (JNS, Zagreb, Sava Banovina)
Nikola Kabalin   (JNS, Zagreb, Sava Banovina)
Stevan Kaćanski
Alija Kadić
Mijo Kajić
Mihailo Kalamatijević   (JNS, Štip, Vardar Banovina)
Branko Kalember   (JNS, Udbina, Sava Banovina)
Branko Kalućerčić
Ismet-beg Gavran Kapetanović   (Čajniče, Drina Banovina)
Joco Kašanin
Mihael Kašper
Vladimir Kazimirović   (JNS, Jabukovac, Morava Banovina)
Anton Kersnik   (JNS, Kamnik, Drava Banovina)
Franc Klar   (JNS, Donja Lendava, Drava Banovina)
Bogoljub Knežević   (JNS, Kruševac, Morava Banovina)
Jure Koce   (JNS, Črnomelj, Drava Banovina)
Dragutin Kojić   (JNS, Skoplje, Vardar Banovina)
Albin Koman   (JNS, Ljubljana, Drava Banovina)
Mirko Komnenović   (JNS, Kotor, Zeta Banovina)
Mirko Kosić
Petar Kosović   (JNS, Bitolj, Vardar Banovina)
Luka Kostrenčić   (JNS, Krk, Sava Banovina)
Ante Kovač   (JNS, Jastrebarsko, Sava Banovina)
Milan Kovačević
Marko Kožul
Stevan Kraft
Dragan Kraljević   (JNS, Slavonska Požega, Sava Banovina)
Mihailo Krstić   (JNS, Ražanj, Morava Banovina)
Simo Krstić   (JNS, Teslić, Vrbas Banovina)
Stojan Krstić   (JNS, Struga, Vardar Banovina)
Džafer Kulenović   (Žepče, Drina Banovina)
Šime Kulišić   (JNS, Vrbovsko, Sava Banovina)
Kosta Kumanudi
Joakim Kunjašić
Milan Kurilić
Velimir Kursulić   (JNS, Raška, Zeta Banovina)
Šukrija Kurtović   (JNS, Foča, Zeta Banovina)
Vojko Kurtović   (JNS, Prijepolje, Zeta Banovina)
Živan Kuveždić
Sreten Kuzeljević   (JNS, Nova Varoš, Zeta Banovina)
Aleksandar Lazarević
Milan Lazarević   (JNS, Kraljevo Selo, Morava Banovina) 
Milovan Lazarević
Nikon Lazarević   (JNS, Rekovac, Morava Banovina)
Todor Lazarević   (JNS, Banja Luka, Vrbas Banovina)
Vojislav Lazić
Stanko Lenarčič   (JNS, Logatec, Drava Banovina)
Mihailo Lješević   (JNS, Prokuplje, Morava Banovina)
Niko Ljubičić
Ivan Lovrenčič   (JNS, Kočevje, Drava Banovina)
Avguštin Lukačič   (JNS, Ljutomer, Drava Banovina)
Mihailo Lukarević   (JNS, Vranje, Vardar Banovina)
Vladko Maček
Artur Mahnik   (JNS, Zagreb, Sava Banovina)
Ivan Majcan   (United Opposition, Donji Miholjac, Sava Banovina)
Dako Makar   (JNS, Metlika, Drava Banovina)
Franjo Malčić   (United Opposition, Zagreb, Sava Banovina)
Dane Malić   (United Opposition, Krapina, Sava Banovina)
Miloje Marcikić
Simo Marjanac   (JNS, Jajce, Vrbas Banovina)
Franjo Markić
Đorđe Marković   (JNS, Hrvatska Kostajnica, Sava Banovina)
Milenko Marković   (JNS, Pakrac, Sava Banovina)
Ante Mastrović
Pavao Matica   (JNS, Ivanec, Sava Banovina)
Stipe Matijević
Martin Mesarov   (United Opposition, Virovitica, Sava Banovina)
Ilija Mihailović
Todor Mihailović   (JNS, Kosovska Mitrovica, Zeta Banovina)
Milan Mijić   (JNS, Ključ, Vrbas Banovina)
Aleksandar Mijović   (JNS, Boljevac, Morava Banovina)
Luka Mijušković   (JNS, Istok, Zeta Banovina)
Đuro Mikašinović   (JNS, Ogulin, Sava Banovina)
Mato Mikić   (United Opposition, Gradačac, Vrbas Banovina)
Sava Mikić   (JNS, Bijelo Polje, Zeta Banovina)
Života Milanović   (JNS, Slatina, Sava Banovina)
Vjekoslav Miletić   (JNS, Rab, Sava Banovina)
Velimir Milijanović
Branko Miljuš   (JNS, Sanski Most, Vrbas Banovina)
Dušan R. Milošević   (JNS, Banja Luka, Vrbas Banovina)
Dušan S. Milošević   (JNS, Vlasotince, Vardar Banovina)
Radivoje Milošević   (JNS, Podujevo, Morava Banovina)
Dragomir Milovanović   (JNS, Sokobanja, Morava Banovina)
Milinko Milutinović
Dimitrije Mirković   (JNS, Golubac, Morava Banovina)
Roko Mišetić   (United Opposition, Dubrovnik, Zeta Banovina)
Mile Miškulin   (JNS, Perušić, Sava Banovina)
Petar Mladineo
Ivan Mohorič   (JNS, Radovljica, Drava Banovina)
Karlo Mrak   (United Opposition, Pisarovina, Sava Banovina)
Milan Mravlje   (JNS, Litija, Drava Banovina)
Mustafa Mulalić (JNS, Gračanica,  Vrbas Banovina)
Osman Muradbašić   (United Opposition, Maglaj, Vrbas Banovina)
Radivoje Nanović   (JNS, Valandovo, Vardar Banovina)
Vojislav Nenadić   (JNS, Pljevlja, Zeta Banovina)
Jovan Nenadović   (JNS, Carevo Selo, Vardar Banovina)
Uroš Nedeljković
Spaso Nićiforović   (JNS, Tutin, Zeta Banovina)
Časlav Nikitović   (JNS, Radovište, Vardar Banovina)
Branko Nikolić
Milovan Nikolić
Radivoje Nikolić
Slavko Nikolić
Živko Nikolić
Anton Novačan   (JNS, Slovenj Gradec, Drava Banovina)
Franjo Novaković   (United Opposition, Đurđevac, Sava Banovina)
Niko Novaković
Stjepan Novaković   (JNS, Varaždin, Sava Banovina)
Josip Palajić   (United Opposition, Novska, Sava Banovina)
Ljubomir Pantić
Andrija Papa   (United Opposition, Križevci, Sava Banovina)
Hadži-Ljuba Partnogić   (JNS, Prizren, Vardar Banovina)
Manfred Paštrović
Branko Paunović
Ante Pavlović   (United Opposition, Brinje, Sava Banovina)
Gojko Pejin
Čedomir Pejkić   (JNS, Despotovac, Morava Banovina)
Malić Pelivanović   (JNS, Dragaš, Vardar Banovina)
Milivoje Perić
Dušan Perović   (JNS, Negotin na Vardaru, Vardar Banovina)
Miljan Perović   (JNS, Lebane, Vardar Banovina)
Đorđe Petković   (United Opposition, Svilajnac, Morava Banovina)
Milan Petković
Rastko Petković
Bogdan Petrović   (JNS, Kuršumlija, Morava Banovina)
Rudolf Pevec   (United Opposition, Gornji Grad, Drava Banovina)
Milovan Pinterović   (JNS, Osijek, Sava Banovina)
Rudolf Pleskovič   (JNS, Laško, Drava Banovina)
Aćim Popović   (JNS, Preševo, Vardar Banovina)
Dobrivoje Popović   (JNS, Aleksandrovac, Morava Banovina)
Dušan Popović
Kosta Popović
Mihailo Popović   (JNS, Resan, Vardar Banovina)
Novica Popović   (JNS, Andrijevica, Zeta Banovina)
Svetislav Popović
Velimir Popović   (JNS, Paraćin, Morava Banovina)
Živko Popović   (JNS, Gnjilane, Vardar Banovina)
Živojin Popović   (JNS, Ćuprija, Morava Banovina)
Matija Povrenović
Nurija Pozderac   (United Opposition, Cazin, Vrbas Banovina)
Krsto Predovan
Nikola Preka
Ivan Prekoršek   (JNS, Celje, Drava Banovina)
Muhamed Preljubović   (Kladanj, Drina Banovina)
Milan Pribićević   (United Opposition, Dvor, Vrbas Banovina)
Jeremija Protić
Miloje Radaković
Danilo Radoičić   (JNS, Šavnik, Zeta Banovina)
Milivoje Rafailović
Živojin Rafailović   (JNS, Bosiljgrad, Vardar Banovina)
Ramadan Ramadanović   (JNS, Suva Reka, Vardar Banovina)
Miloš Rašković   (JNS, Trstenik, Morava Banovina)
Miloš Rašović   (United Opposition, Podgorica, Zeta Banovina)
Branko Ratković   (JNS, Ljubinje, Zeta Banovina)
Josip Režek   (JNS, Novo Mesto, Drava Banovina)
Muhamed Rićanović
Ivan Robić   (United Opposition, Velika Gorica, Sava Banovina)
Josip Rogić   (JNS, Senj, Sava Banovina)
Marko Ružičić
Gavro Santo
Ibrahim Sarić   (Sarajevo, Drina Banovina)
Obren Savić   (JNS, Uroševac, Vardar Banovina)
Milan Sekulić
Stevan Simić   (JNS, Kratovo, Vardar Banovina)
Čedomir Sladojević   (JNS, Nikšić, Zeta Banovina)
Bariša Smoljan
Miloje Sokić   (JNS, Đakovica, Zeta Banovina)
Momčilo Sokić
Nikola Sokolović   (JNS, Grubišno Polje, Sava Banovina)
Vukašin Spasović
Uroš Stajić   (JNS, Caribrod, Morava Banovina)
Aleksandar Stanković   (JNS, Babušnica, Morava Banovina)
Svetolik Stanković
Svetozar Stanković
Ignjat Stefanović   (JNS, Kavadarci, Vardar Banovina)
Milivoj Stepanov   (JNS, Garešnica, Sava Banovina)
Risto Stevović   (United Opposition, Priboj, Zeta Banovina)
Milan Stijić   (JNS, Našice, Sava Banovina)
Radmilo Stoiljković   (United Opposition, Kumanovo, Vardar Banovina)
Dragiša Stojadinović   (JNS, Negotin, Morava Banovina)
Dragomir Stojadinović
Mihailo Stojadinović
Petar Stojisavljević
Stamenko Stošić   (JNS, Kriva Palanka, Vardar Banovina)
Dobrivoje Stošović   (JNS, Prokuplje, Morava Banovina)
Zajnel-beg Ibraim Stracimir  (JNS, Kačanik, Vardar Banovina)
Mijo Stuparić   (United Opposition, Kutina, Sava Banovina)
Dušan Subotić   (JNS, Bosanska Gradiška, Vrbas Banovina)
Ivan Šakić
Fran Šemrov   (JNS, Kranj, Drava Banovina)
Nikola Šijak
Anton Širola-Brnas   (JNS, Kastav, Sava Banovina)
Luka Šoški   (JNS, Bjelovar, Sava Banovina)
Stojan Špadijer   (United Opposition, Cetinje, Zeta Banovina)
Ivan Šubašić   (United Opposition, Delnice, Sava Banovina)
Živko Šušić   (JNS, Novi Pazar, Zeta Banovina)
Jure Šutej
Svetozar Tasić   (JNS, Bitolj, Vardar Banovina)
Maksim Tešić   (JNS, Kotor Varoš, Vrbas Banovina)
Vladimir Tišma   (JNS, Donji Lapac, Sava Banovina)
Branislav Todorović   (JNS, Rostuša, Vardar Banovina)
Todor Todorović   (JNS, Zaječar, Morava Banovina)
Žarko Tomašević   (JNS, Vukovar, Sava Banovina)
Ljudevit Tomašić   (United Opposition, Samobor, Sava Banovina)
Branko Tomić
Jevrem Tomić
Todor Tonić   (JNS, Leskovac, Vardar Banovina)
Josip Torbar   (United Opposition, Zlatar, Sava Banovina)
Vasilije Trbić   (JNS, Prilep, Vardar Banovina)
Stavra Trpković   (JNS, Kičevo, Vardar Banovina)
Ante Trumbić
Rajko Turk   (JNS, Ljubljana, Drava Banovina)
Mirko Urošević   (JNS, Žagubica, Morava Banovina)
Tihomir Vasić  (Ljubovija, Drina Banovina)
Andrej Veble   (JNS, Brežice, Drava Banovina)
Miladin Veličković   (JNS, Vladičin Han, Vardar Banovina)
Milorad Veselinović   (Batina, Danube Banovina)
Anton Videc   (JNS, Čakovec, Sava Banovina)
Petar Vlatković   (JNS, Petrinja, Sava Banovina)
Velimir Vrbić   (Užice, Drina Banovina)
Radisav Vučetić   (Ub, Drina Banovina)
Vuk Vujasinović   (Benkovac, Littoral Banovina)
Dimitrije Vujić   (Petrovgrad, Danube Banovina)
Srpko Vukanović   (Senta, Danube Banovina)
Milan Vukićević   (Vračar, Danube Banovina)
Josip-Đido Vuković   (Subotica, Danube Banovina)
Jovo Zagorac
Čedomir Zaharić
Jovan Zdravković
Sekula Zečević   (JNS, Nevesinje, Zeta Banovina)
Boško Zeljković   (JNS, Bosanska Krupa, Vrbas Banovina)
Nikola Zuber   (JNS, Cetinje, Zeta Banovina)
Fran Zupančič   (JNS, Krško, Drava Banovina)
Borisav Živadinović   (JNS, Žitkovac, Morava Banovina)
Radosav Živković
Todor Živković   (JNS, Veles, Vardar Banovina)
Karlo Žunjević   (United Opposition, Preko, Littoral Banovina)

References

External links
The Elections to the Parliament of the Kingdom of the Serbs, Croats & Slovenes 1920 - 1938

Yugoslavia
Parliamentary election
Elections in Yugoslavia
Yugoslavia
Election and referendum articles with incomplete results